"Outrun the Sun" is an English language song by the Norwegian urban duo Madcon featuring vocals from Maad*Moiselle. It is the third single released from their fourth album Contraband. The song was written by Jonas Jeberg, Terence Abney, Tshawe Baqwa, Yosef Wolde-Mariam, Marcella Brailsford, Kasper Larsen, Ole Brodersen. It was released on 19 November 2010.
The video was directed by Mauri Chifflet and produced by :sv:lillasyster produktion

Track listing

German CD single
"Outrun the Sun" (feat. Maad*Moiselle) – 3:12
"Outrun the Sun" (feat. Maad*Moiselle) (Cosmic Dawn Radio Edit) – 3:50

Credits and personnel
Lead vocals – Madcon and Maad Moiselle
Lyrics – Terence Abney, Tshawe Baqwa, Yosef Wolde-Mariam, Marcella Brailsford, Kasper Larsen, Ole Brodersen
Producer – Jonas Jeberg
Label – Cosmos Music Norway

Charts

Release history

References

2010 singles
Songs written by Jonas Jeberg
2010 songs
Madcon songs